Chorlaki is a union council of Kohat District in the Khyber Pakhtunkhwa province of Pakistan. Chorlaki is located along the Punjab and Khyber Pakhtunkhwa border with the Indus River. The population of Chorlaki is around 10,000. the peoples of Chorlaki are reportedly hospitable, honest and peaceful. Education in Chorlaki is high. Approximately 94% of population is literate. People mostly depend on government jobs.

See also 
 Kohat District

External links
Khyber-Pakhtunkhwa Government website section on Lower Dir
United Nations
Hajjinfo.org Uploads
 PBS paiman.jsi.com 

Kohat District
Populated places in Kohat District
Union councils of Khyber Pakhtunkhwa
Union Councils of Kohat District